Orbest was a Portuguese charter airline headquartered in Lisbon and based at Lisbon Airport, that operated scheduled and charter flights in short and long haul operations, mainly out of Portugal on behalf of tour operators but also out of Spain on behalf of its sister company Iberojet.

History
The company was set up in 2007 by the Orizonia Group. Orbest started operations with a single Airbus A330-200, registration CS-TRA. This aircraft remained with the airline until 2010, when the Orizonia Group announced an upgrade to a new and larger Airbus A330-300.

Following the collapse of the Orizonia Corporation, Orbest was purchased by the Barceló Group. The group also created a new airline under the name Evelop Airlines for operations in Spain, which received airplanes from both Orbest and the former Orbest Orizonia Airlines, all aircraft owned by Orbest are now also operated by Evelop.

On 8 December, 2020, Orbest merged with Evelop Airlines and was renamed to Iberojet.

Destinations

As of August 2018, Orbest served the following destinations:

Cuba
Varadero - Juan Gualberto Gómez Airport

Dominican Republic
Punta Cana - Punta Cana International Airport

Mexico
Cancún - Cancún International Airport

Portugal
Lisbon - Lisbon Portela Airport base

Fleet
As of August 2020, the Orbest fleet consisted of the following aircraft:

References

External links

Official website

Defunct airlines of Portugal
Airlines established in 2007
Airlines disestablished in 2020
Portuguese companies established in 2007
2020 disestablishments in Portugal